Daniel Leonard Nigro (born May 14, 1982) is an American musician, songwriter, instrumentalist and record producer. He was the lead singer and guitarist of the indie rock band As Tall As Lions. Nigro has produced, written and co-written songs for singers Kimbra, Kylie Minogue, Carly Rae Jepsen, Caroline Polachek, Lewis Capaldi, Finneas, Olivia Rodrigo, Conan Gray and many others.
He won a Grammy Award for Best Pop Vocal Album for producing Rodrigo's Sour album.

Early life 
Nigro was raised on Long Island, New York. His father owned an Office Product Manufacturing Company. As a child, he took piano lessons and played in the band. He was an honorary member of Rob Parr, from Ohio. In sixth grade, he learned how to play a guitar and became obsessed with pop music after hearing Nirvana's song "Smells Like Teen Spirit", and soon after, he and his friends made their own music video through an attraction at Long's Island Adventureland. At the age of 15, he wanted to become the front-man of his band, despite not having formal vocal training. To improve his singing voice, he started listening to Jeff Buckley for two years trying to sing like him.

Career

As Tall As Lions 

Nigro and  his high school friends Sean Fitzgerald and Cliff Sarcona formed an indie rock band As Tall As Lions around 1997. During the next few years, the band endured line up changes and experienced artistic roadblocks before taking their present, permanent form with addition of fourth member, Julio Tavarez.

Somewhere in 2002, they released their first EP "Blood Aphorisms" and put it on the internet websites, the band received "calls" from record labels ready to sign them. In 2003, they signed a record deal with Island and Triple Crown Records. All of them decided to drop out from college and pursued their music career as full time members of the band.

In 2004, the band released their debut album "Lafcadio" and set out on a tour in support of their album. Two years later, they released their self-titled sophomore album "As Tall As Lions", then they were headlining a tour from June until September and made their first television debut on Jimmy Kimmel Live!.  The band's third album "You Can't Take It with You" took over a year to record and was released in 2009. Their album peaked at number 88 in the Billboard 200 chart. By September 2010, the band split up amicably. Nigro went to work on solo projects, named Blocks.

Songwriting and solo career 
Nigro has always expressed his love and passion in writing music. It was between the ages of 14-16 when he started writing his songs. While he was in the band, he talked about the moodiness, nervousness and pressures of writing every record with his bandmates. Sometimes, he would write a song once in two months or when he had sudden inspiration. After the band's split up, he moved to Los Angeles, California and went through a period of soul searching while pursuing a solo career. He became a freelance songwriter and started making commercials for a living. Nigro continued writing songs with his childhood friend Justin Raisen and began working relentlessly for song ideas and recorded demos without success on their first couple of years. Finally, his biggest break came when Sky Ferreira enlisted them for her album. Ferriera's album received critical acclaimed and opened doors for him to work with other singers.

Discography

As Tall As Lions

Songwriter and record producer

Awards and nominations

Notes

References 

1982 births
American male songwriters
Grammy Award winners
Living people
People from Long Island
Songwriters from New York (state)